Paavo Piironen (6 June 1943 in Helsinki – 6 November 1974) was a Finnish film and television actor, director and writer of the 1960s and early 1970s. He is perhaps best known for his work on the 1971 film comedy Saatanan radikaalit in which he starred and co-directed alongside Heikki Nousiainen, Timo Nissi and Heikki Huopainen.

He died in 1974 in a traffic accident.

Filmography

Tyttö ja hattu (1961)
Oksat pois... (1961)
Pikku Suorasuu (1962)
Pähkähullu Suomi (1967)
Lauantai (1967)
Speedy Gonzales - Noin 7 veljeksen poika (1970)
Akseli and Elina (1970)
Saatanan radikaalit (1971)
Kahdeksas veljes (1971)

External links

1943 births
1974 deaths
Male actors from Helsinki
Finnish writers
20th-century Finnish male actors
Writers from Helsinki